Julio Daniel Frías Adame (born March 29, 1979 in Ciudad Juárez, Chihuahua, Mexico) is a former Mexican footballer who last played for the El Paso Coyotes in the Major Arena Soccer League .

Frías made his professional debut with Indios in 2008. He is widely recognized in Ciudad Juárez due to his striking abilities and capacities. He is a living example of how the sport can help Drug addiction. Additionally he is the leading goalscorer of Indios de Ciudad Juárez with 30 (Goals scored in Liga de Ascenso). He is known among the fans as "Maleno". Born in the suburbs of Juarez, Mexico known as La Colonia Altavista, he would spend most of his time there as a kid, in and out of teams, but gaining experience on the way, falling into drug addiction was one of the hardest times of "Maleno's" life.

External links
mediotiempo.com

1979 births
Living people
Mexican footballers
Sportspeople from Chihuahua (state)
Association football forwards
Tigres UANL footballers
El Paso Patriots players
Indios de Ciudad Juárez footballers
Chiapas F.C. footballers
A-League (1995–2004) players
USL League Two players
Liga MX players
Major Arena Soccer League players
El Paso Coyotes players
Mexican expatriate footballers
Mexican expatriate sportspeople in the United States
Expatriate soccer players in the United States